Jamie Cassidy (born 21 November 1977 in Liverpool) is an English former footballer who played as a midfielder in the Football League for Cambridge United. He began his career with Liverpool. While at Anfield, he won the FA Youth Cup in 1996, and earned a professional contract, but was released in 1999 without playing a first-team game. He then spent one year at Cambridge United, playing 10 matches in all competitions, before moving into non-league football with Cambridge City, Northwich Victoria and Burscough.

Jamie Carragher recalled in his 2008 autobiography Carra that Cassidy would have been "a certain Liverpool regular", if his development had not been derailed by a damaged cruciate ligament then a broken leg.

References

Bibliography

External links
 

1977 births
Living people
Footballers from Liverpool
English footballers
Liverpool F.C. players
Cambridge United F.C. players
Cambridge City F.C. players
Northwich Victoria F.C. players
Burscough F.C. players
Association football midfielders